Hindsiclava blountensis is an extinct species of sea snail, a marine gastropod mollusc in the family Pseudomelatomidae, the turrids and allies.

Distribution
Fossils of this marine species were found in Miocene strata in Florida, USA.

References

 Mansfield, Wendell Clay. New Miocene gastropods and scaphopods from Alaqua Creek Valley, Florida. State board of conservation, Geological Department, 1935.
 W. P. Woodring. 1970. Geology and paleontology of canal zone and adjoining parts of Panama: Description of Tertiary mollusks (gastropods: Eulimidae, Marginellidae to Helminthoglyptidae). United States Geological Survey Professional Paper 306(D):299–452

External links
 Fossilworks: † Crassispira (Hindsiclava) blountensis

blountensis
Gastropods described in 1935